Wolrad Eberle (4 May 1908, Freiburg – 13 May 1949, Cologne) was a German decathlete.

He won the bronze medal at the 1932 Summer Olympics held in Los Angeles, California.

References

1908 births
1949 deaths
German decathletes
Athletes (track and field) at the 1932 Summer Olympics
Olympic athletes of Germany
Olympic bronze medalists for Germany
Sportspeople from Freiburg im Breisgau
Medalists at the 1932 Summer Olympics
Olympic bronze medalists in athletics (track and field)